Darren Yewchyn was a former Canadian football wide receiver who played two seasons with the Winnipeg Blue Bombers of the Canadian Football League. He played college football at the College of the Siskiyous.

References

External links
Just Sports Stats

Winnipeg Blue Bombers
Players of Canadian football from Manitoba
Canadian football wide receivers
American football wide receivers
Canadian players of American football
Winnipeg Blue Bombers players
Canadian football people from Winnipeg
1965 births
Living people